Kevin Goldthwaite (born December 9, 1982) is a former American soccer player who last played as a defender for Portland Timbers of Major League Soccer.

Career

College
After graduating from Christian Brothers High School (Sacramento, California),
Goldthwaite played college soccer at the University of Notre Dame from 2001 to 2004. He was named second-team all-Big East as a junior in 2003 and first-team all-Big East in 2004. Goldthwaite was also a semifinalist for the Hermann Trophy in 2004. He led the Irish with nine assists in 2003 and also scored two goals in an NCAA tournament game against Milwaukee. He also played for Indiana Invaders in the USL Premier Development League.

Professional
Goldthwaite was selected 17th overall in the 2005 MLS SuperDraft by the San Jose Earthquakes but was loaned to the Portland Timbers of the USL First Division during his first year. He played in eight reserve matches for San Jose, scoring two goals, and made two U.S. Open Cup appearances for the Earthquakes. He also made 10 regular-season and two post-season appearances with Portland, rejoining San Jose after the Timbers' playoff loss. He played in three regular-season games and one playoff contest for the Earthquakes, earning an assist in his Major League Soccer debut.

Along with the rest of his Earthquakes teammates, Goldthwaite moved to the Houston Dynamo for the 2006 season and saw sporadic time on the back line. On April 18, 2007, he was traded along with a first-round pick in 2008 MLS SuperDraft to Toronto FC for Richard Mulrooney. He scored Toronto's first ever game-winning goal in the match against Chicago Fire on May 12, 2007, but was moved to New York Red Bulls in a trade for Todd Dunivant on June 27, 2007. After struggling in 2007 with New York, Goldthwaite emerged as a key player for the Red Bulls in 2008. He started 28 regular season matches, scoring 2 goals and recording 2 assists. His consistency throughout the season earned him the club's Defender of the Year Award. He then helped lead the Red Bulls to an unlikely appearance in the MLS Cup Final, playing in a back line that yielded one goal in three playoff matches. In 2009 Goldthwaite had an injury-riddled season for New York limiting him to 17 league appearances.

Goldthwaite was unable to recover from his injuries during the 2010 season and was waived by New York on August 6, 2010 to make room on the Red Bulls roster for new signing Rafael Márquez. On August 25, 2010, Portland Timbers signed Goldthwaite for the remainder of the 2010 USSF Division-2 Professional League season. Having played for Portland in 2005 while on loan from San Jose Earthquakes, it is his second stint in the Rose City.

On November 28, 2011, Goldthwaite announced his retirement from professional soccer at the age of 28.

Career statistics
https://web.archive.org/web/20080429185627/http://web.mlsnet.com/history/register.jsp?content=players_p

Honors

Houston Dynamo
Major League Soccer MLS Cup (1): 2006

New York Red Bulls
Major League Soccer Western Conference Championship (1): 2008

References

External links
 Portland Timbers bio
 

1982 births
Living people
American soccer players
San Jose Earthquakes players
Houston Dynamo FC players
Toronto FC players
New York Red Bulls players
USL League Two players
USL First Division players
Major League Soccer players
USSF Division 2 Professional League players
Portland Timbers (2001–2010) players
Portland Timbers players
Indiana Invaders players
Notre Dame Fighting Irish men's soccer players
Expatriate soccer players in Canada
San Jose Earthquakes draft picks
Association football defenders
Soccer players from Sacramento, California